Lubao, officially the Municipality of Lubao, is a 1st class municipality in the province of Pampanga, Philippines. According to the 2020 census, it has a population of 173,502 people.

It is noted for rice, sugar cane, fish, and sampaguita.

Etymology
The town's name derives from the indigenous term lubo which means low or sunken, reflective of the area's muddy and flooded characteristics. Lubao is also known by its Kapampangan language equivalent Baba.

Geography
Located in the south-western part of Pampanga, Lubao is bounded by the municipalities of Sasmuan on the east, Guagua on the north-east, Floridablanca on the north and Hermosa, Bataan, on the south.

Barangays
Lubao is politically subdivided into 44 barangays.

Cluster 1:

 San Isidro
 Santiago
 Santo Niño (Prado Saba)
 San Roque Arbol
 Baruya (San Rafael)
 Lourdes (Lauc Pau)
 Prado Siongco

Cluster 2:

 San Jose Gumi
 Balantacan
 Santa Teresa 2nd
 Bancal Sinubli
 Bancal Pugad
 Calangain

Cluster 3:

 San Pedro Palcarangan
 San Pedro Saug
 San Pablo 1st
 San Pablo 2nd
 De La Paz
 Santa Cruz

Cluster 4:

 Remedios
 Santa Maria
 Del Carmen
 San Agustin
 Santa Rita
 Santa Teresa 1st

Cluster 5:

 Santo Tomas (Poblacion)
 San Roque Dau
 Santo Cristo
 San Matias
 Don Ignacio Dimson
 Santa Monica

Cluster 6:

 Santo Domingo
 San Miguel
 Concepcion
 San Francisco
 San Vicente
 San Antonio
 San Jose Apunan

Cluster 7:

 San Nicolas 2nd
 San Juan (Poblacion)
 San Nicolas 1st (Poblacion)
 Santa Barbara
 Santa Catalina
 Santa Lucia (Poblacion)

Climate

Demographics

Religion

As the first Augustinian missionary center in Central and Northern Luzon, majority of the residents in Lubao are Roman Catholics.

Lubao at present has six parishes :
 San Agustin Parish, Plaza, Lubao (oldest in Pampanga - Established 1572)
 San Roque Dau Parish, San Roque Dau, Lubao (established Oct.1, 1990)
 Holy Cross Parish, Santa Cruz, Lubao (established May 22, 1951)
 San Rafael Parish, Baruya, Lubao (established August 31, 1939)
 San Antonio de Padua Parish, San Antonio, Lubao (established November 10, 1986)
 Conversion of St. Paul Parish, San Pablo 1st, Lubao (newly established - 2010)

There are adherents of Iglesia ni Cristo wherein a chapel in Barangay Baruya was dedicated to God on November 26, 2011, with Pastoral Visitation of the present Executive Minister of the Iglesia ni Cristo Brother Eduardo V. Manalo.

The Church of Jesus Christ of Latter-day Saints (Mormons) has also significant numbers of member in the town, last August 17, 2012, they celebrated their 25th Year anniversary of the Opening of the Missionary work in the said town with Cong. Juan Miguel Macapagal Arroyo as the special guest. The chapel is located at Santa Cruz, Lubao, Pampanga with 600 Members.

Other religion includes Protestantism and Nondenominational Christianity. Among the Protestant churches in Lubao are the United Methodist Church, C&MA, Pentecostal, and Baptist.

The Seventh-day Adventist Church that has 1,100 members is also a remarkable distinct denomination for giving community services and free livelihood seminar to the town all the year round.

Economy

Festivals

Sampaguita Festival
The Parish of Saint Augustine celebrated its 440th Founding Anniversary on May 5, 2012, with the launching of the 1st Sampaguita Festival; participated by the six parishes of Lubao. Parish of St. Augustine de Hippo bagged the Over-All Champion trophy.

2nd Sampaguita Festival was held on May 5, 2013, participated by the 10 secondary public schools of Lubao. San Vicente National High School emerged as the Over-All Champion of the festival.

The 3rd Sampaguita Festival was celebrated on May 4, 2014, and participated by the 7 clustered barangays of Lubao. Cluster 6 (Cluster Malagu - Barangay Santo Domingo, San Miguel, Concepcion, San Francisco, San Vicente,

Philippine International Balloon Festival
The 1st ever Philippine International Balloon Festival was held on April 10–13, 2014 in Barangay Prado Siongco, Lubao, Pampanga. It was organized by Pilipinas International Balloon Festival, Inc. (PIBF) in cooperation with the Arts, Culture and Tourism Office of Pampanga (ACTO) with the theme "It's More Than Just Hot Air"

Lubao International Balloon Festival
The 2nd Lubao International Balloon Festival was held on March 26 to 29, 2015 in Pradera Verde, Prado Siongco, Lubao, Pampanga. It was organized by Forthinker Inc. Philippines.  It was touted as the biggest annual hot air balloon festival in Southeast Asia that featured more than forty (40) colorful hot air balloons from different countries all over the world, fourteen (14) of which are special shaped balloons like Darth Vader, Yoda, Humpty Dumpty and Frog.

The 3rd edition of Lubao International Balloon Festival was held on April 14–17, 2016 in Pradera Verde, Prado Siongco, Lubao, Pampanga.

Lubao International Balloon and Music Festival
From April 6 to 9, 2017, the Lubao International Balloon and Music Festival was held. For the 4th year in a row, 35 balloons showered the skies of Lubao, Pampanga with their magnificent design and beautiful colors while wonderful music from international artists (Alex Aiono and Redfoo) and local artists (Sponge Cola, Gloc 9, Parokya ni Edgar, Moonstar88, Yeng Constantino and Bamboo) graced the event.

Government

The municipal government is divided into three branches: executive, legislative and judiciary. The executive branch is composed of the mayor and the barangay captains. The legislative branch is composed of the Sangguniang Bayan (town assembly), Sangguniang Barangay (barangay council), and the Sangguniang Kabataan for the youth sector.

Landmarks and notable heritage structures

Lubao Institute
The Lubao Institute is in front of the Diosdado Macapagal Museum and Library which is at the back of his Bahay Kubo birthplace. Some meters from these 2 landmarks is the San Nicolas Lubao residence of Gloria Macapagal Arroyo. Lubao Institute or LI is the first and oldest private school in Lubao established in 1929.

Escolastica Romero District Hospital
The Escolastica Romero District Hospital located in San Nicolas 1st, Lubao and St. Joseph Hospital of Remedios located in Barangay Remedios, Lubao are the prime health institutions of the town.

San Agustin Church

The parish church of San Agustin (considered one of the oldest in Pampanga - 1572) celebrated its 440th Founding Anniversary last May 5, 2012, with the launching of the 1st Sampaguita Festival; participated by the six parishes of Lubao. And the reception of the relics of St. Augustine & St. Monica. The church was declared by the National Historical Commission as Important Cultural Property last August 28, 2013 (441st Founding Anniversary).

Other notable landmarks
 Diosdado Macapagal Birthplace House / Library & Museum
 Jose B. Lingad Park & Museum located at San Nicolas 1st, Lubao
 MRF Charcoal making environment friendly
 Lubao Bamboo Nature Park located at Santa Catalina, Lubao
 Pradera Verde situated at Barangay Prado Siongco, Lubao (venue of the annual Lubao International Balloon and Music Festival)

Baybay Ilog

Baybay Ilog (Sagip Ilog) is a project of Department of Tourism and Congresswoman Gloria Macapagal Arroyo.

In the Baybay Ilog, Bye-bye Basura project, officials and volunteers gathered at the Banqueruan Port in San Nicolas 1st, Lubao where the clean-up drive started.  After a brief program, the whole contingent coursed the river, checked the preparation of the communities and conducted the river clean-up. The Lubao-Sasmuan River was one of the ecosystems heavily affected when Mount Pinatubo erupted 20 years ago. With this project coinciding with the anniversary of the said volcanic eruption and our country's independence day celebration, the people from Lubao and Sasmuan are looking at it as a liberation from the dreaded effects of the said natural disaster which, through tourism, will pave the way for the rise to progress of the said communities.  Once again, the river is resuming its role, as a driving factor for the growth of a civilization.

The symbolic river clean-up dubbed as “Baybay-Ilog, Bye-bye Basura”, is the first step in preparing the people in 17 identified Barangays that will benefit from the Pampanga bayou river cruise project spearheaded by the local government units of Sasmuan and Lubao in cooperation with the Provincial government of Pampanga and the second district congressional office of Gloria Macapagal Arroyo. River Clean-up held last June 12, 2011. This event mobilized more than 700 volunteers from Sasmuan and Lubao for ground and boat contingents. With the support of the Local Government Units of Sasmuan and Lubao, Community Volunteers and Social Preparation Group of Pampanga Bayou Development Project, this was really an astounding success.

700 volunteers from 13 coastal barangays boarded participating boats at the Banqueruan banca port at the town of San Nicolas, Lubao to participate in the symbolic river cleanup shortly after the sun rose on an otherwise lazy Sunday morning. Armed with cleaning tools, the residents carefully rid the river of wastes in preparation for the formal launch of the town's newest tourist attraction – the Pampanga river bayou cruise. Prior to the river cleanup, Christian Narito, project leader of the social preparation phase of the Pampanga Wetlands Development Project, said the identified 17 barangay communities located along the cruise route had earlier been educated about the benefits tourism could bring into the communities. “People within and around the area participated in determining how will they react or be affected by any major development planned within their area of residence. We helped them identify their strengths and how they could contribute to the river cruise project,” Narito said.

Education

The private and public sectors jointly provide quality education to Lubao residents.

Private Schools
 Lubao Institute (Lubao Institute or LI is located in San Nicolas 1st, Lubao, Pampanga. Established in February 1929)
 Holy Rosary Academy (HRA - Founded 1950 by the RVM)
 Maccim Royal Academy (MRA - Founded 2004)
 Santa Cruz Academy of Lubao, Inc. (SCA - Founded by Former Mayor Dr. Conrado Paule Jimenez Jr.)
 Holy Cross Institute (Former Sta. Cruz Central Institute Founded by Agustin M. Manuel)
 Lourdes Academy

Public Schools
 Lubao National High School
 Bancal Pugad Integrated School (High School Dept.) 
 Baruya High School
 Del Carmen High School
 Prado Siongco High School
 Remedios High School
 San Jose Gumi Integrated School (High School Dept.) 
 San Pablo 2nd High School
 San Roque Arbol High School
 San Roque Dau High School
 San Vicente National High School
 Santa Cruz National High School
 Santa Tereza 2nd High School
 Wenceslao Village High School
 Santiago National High School (Est. June 5, 2017)

College and Technical Schools
Somascans Minor College Seminary, Prado Siongco
West Central College of Arts and Science, Santa Cruz
Don Honorio Ventura State University (Lubao, Branch)

Notable personalities

 Diosdado Macapagal - was the 9th President of the Philippines, serving from 1961 to 1965.
 Purita Macapagal - was the first wife of Philippine president Diosdado Macapagal. The sister of Rogelio and Jaime de la Rosa.
 Arturo Macapagal - was a Filipino shooter who competed at the 1972 and 1976 Summer Olympics at the free pistol event. 
 Gloria Macapagal Arroyo - is a Filipino professor and politician who served as the 14th president of the Philippines from 2001 until 2010, as the 10th vice president of the Philippines from 1998 to 2001, as the deputy speaker of the 17th Congress and a member of the House of Representatives representing the 2nd District of Pampanga since 2010. Arroyo is currently the Speaker of the House of Representatives of the Philippines, since 2018, and the first woman to hold the position.
 Mikey Arroyo - Filipino politician and actor
 Dato Arroyo - Filipino politician who served as a member of the House of Representatives from 2007 to 2016.
 Arwind Santos - is a PBA basketball player 9x Champion and MVP an alumnus of Lubao Institute Pampanga. He is currently playing for NorthPort Batang Pier
 Ian Sangalang - is a PBA basketball player 4x Champion and an alumnus of Lubao Institute. Currently playing for Magnolia Hotshots
 Jose B. Lingad - was a Filipino politician who served as provincial governor and congressman from Pampanga.
 Rogelio de la Rosa - is one of the most popular Filipino matinee idols of the 20th century and elected to the Philippine Senate from 1957 to 1963.
 Jaime de la Rosa - is a Filipino pre-war and postwar actor better known as Jimmy in Philippine showbiz.
 Ato Agustin - better known as Ato "The Atom Bomb" Agustin, is a former Filipino professional basketball player. 
 Cecile Licad - is a renowned Filipina virtuoso classical pianist.
 Gregorio Fernandez - was a Filipino film actor and director, and father of Rudy Fernandez.
 Rudy Fernandez - also known as "Daboy", was a multi-awarded Filipino actor and producer.
 Angela Fernando - is a fashion model and beauty queen from Lubao, Pampanga, Philippines.
 Isabel Preysler - is a Filipina-Spanish socialite with family roots from Lubao.
 Carlos Badion - was a Filipino basketball player.
 Apollo Quiboloy - is a Filipino pastor and church leader of the Philippines-based Restorationist church called the Kingdom of Jesus Christ (KJC).
 Dennis Pineda - is a Filipino politician from the province of Pampanga in the Philippines.
 Lilia Pineda - is a Filipina politician and current vice governor of Pampanga
 Bienvenido Santos - Filipino-American fiction, poetry and nonfiction writer

References

External links

 Lubao Profile at PhilAtlas.com
 
 [ Philippine Standard Geographic Code]
 Philippine Census Information
 Local Governance Performance Management System

Municipalities of Pampanga
Populated places on Manila Bay